Scramble Campbell (born Keith Campbell, 1964) is an American live music painter known for his brightly colored, expressionist paintings and screen prints of bands, musicians, and musical events.

Early life 

Scramble Campbell was born Keith 'David' Campbell, 1964, in Manchester, New Hampshire. In 1971 at the age of seven, he moved to Casselberry, Florida.  He went to Casselberry Elementary School and Lake Howell High School Maitland, Florida. He attended Tampa Technical Institute for Commercial Art, and graduated 1983 with an Associates of Science Degree.

Florida years 

After graduating he moved from Tampa to Altamonte Springs, Florida in 1985 and continued to pursue his artistic career. 1985 Campbell painted his first series of abstract works and signs them Scram 85. After a visit to the Salvador Dalí Museum, in St Petersburg, Florida, Campbell was immensely inspired and proceeded to draw, rapidly filling numerous sketchbooks.
A new style of symbols and characters emerged in his studio art, and ScrambleVision was born. His vast vocabulary of symbols began to emerge in 1985–1986. Scramble says: "the fish is society swimming along, the eyeball is the fully focused individual, that's why he's got a big smile and one eye, he's more centered. The little nose character, he's in everybody, and his eyes are in his nose because his life-force is his breath."
In the 1990s, Campbell's touring and painting career took off, painting with Djs and exhibiting nightclub installations at the Palace in Sanford, Florida.

Career 
Campbell was initially inspired to going out and painting live by LeRoy Neiman. He saw that one could make a living at art. However instead of live sports events, Campbell enjoyed the live-music experience. In 1988 he began his autographed art series of bands by drawing the Ramones, U2, INXS, the B-52's and taking his drawings to the concert to show the bands. Campbell's first one-man art show was a Spaces Gallery in Mount Dora, Florida.

In the 1990s, Campbell's touring and painting career took off, painting with Djs and exhibiting nightclub installations at the Palace in Sanford, Florida. In 1991 he became the Vice President of the Art After Dark program of the Orlando Museum of Art. He was also an invited guest of Perry Farrell to the first Lollapalooza Art Exhibit and installation in Orlando, Florida. This was the beginning of continuing years of special Lollapalooza exhibitions. In 1992 it was titled Scrambled Tuna. He also had many warehouse art installations at the famous raves in central FL. This was an influential year, his first Grateful Dead concert. This was the beginning of much touring. In 1993 he followed the Grateful Dead Spring Tour; twelve cities on the East coast in the Chickens painted Volkswagen called the Ooh Noo Bus.

In 1993 he had his first exposure to the jam-band scene, touring with Phish, Widespread Panic, Blues Traveler, Aquarium Rescue Unit, among many others.  1993 was also the initial year of performance painting with Refried Confusion at the Chicken Ranch in Orlando, Florida. The first being the Psychedelic Easter Egg Hunt.

1994 to 2004

1994 began a tremendous decade of touring and painting for Scramble Campbell. It was the 25th anniversary of Woodstock Music and Art Festival in Saugerties, New York, called Woodstock '94. Scramble had been commissioned to do an 18 ft x12 ft section of the Woodstock Wall surrounding concert grounds.

Also, he was commissioned by Absolut Vodka to create an 8 ft x 40 ft Absolut Love Greenpeace solar powered mural installation in the Eco Village, which was entered into the corporate Greenpeace Collection and was displayed at the home office in Washington, D.C. He then worked on the Absolut Love Absolut Scramble billboard of Art & Love slogan in Seattle. He was at the same time commissioned to perform in Seattle at the Jazz & Yacht Club, where he live performance-painted an 8-foot x 24-foot mural of the billboard. The following year he was commissioned by Absolut Vodka to design the poster for Philadelphia Ballet's program called Leaps & Bounds. He also did performance painting and body-painted dancer that performed in front of Scramble's large mural created during the event.

It was also at Woodstock '94 that he displayed the Ooh Noo Volkswagen Bus.

From 1994 to 2004 Campbell was dedicated to his touring and live art.  Ever increasing the number of shows and paintings, each year adding to his widening circle of performance painting destination dates.

In 2003 Campbell was included in the book Extraordinary Interpretations, Florida's Self-Taught Artists by Gary Monroe.
Campbell made tradition of Woodstock, H.O.R.D.E., New Orleans Jazz & Heritage Festival, Lilith Tour, and every year being the featured artist at Magfest. Painting his original stage backdrops, props and performance painting the bands.

In 1995 he met artist Shay Berry whom he married in, 2004. They moved to Colorado in 2004.

Campbell remained active in arts advocacy from Florida to Colorado. In 2003 he became artist in residence at Red Rocks Amphitheatre. He also had his first solo show at the Red Rocks Gallery.  Campbell was also in the Orlando City Hall Exhibit with one of his most influential artists, Carl Knickerbocker.

In 2004 Campbell was featured in a book by Gary Monroe titled Extraordinary Interpretations: Florida Self Taught Art, with over 60 self-taught artists from all over the state. He toured his Cosmic Folk Art Show,  "environment-transforming installations" created by his crew of fellow artists: Carl Knickerbocker, Regina Smith, Tony Garan, and Morgan Steele. This same crew helped open Scramble's Vision Gallery in Winter Park, Florida. The gallery rotated pieces from all five artists. He moved to Colorado shortly after opening the gallery.
Campbell then took a break from touring to take classes at the 2004 Visionary Art Intensive at the Omega Institute in Rhinebeck, New York with Alex & Allison Grey.

Living in Morrison, Colorado near Red Rocks Scramble painted in his studio as well. He completed Impressions on the Sacred Stones. Studio painting that depicts the history of Red Rocks Amphitheatre completed at Red Rocks home/studio. Sacred Stones has been on display in the Red Rocks visitor center since 2009.

Campbell continued to travel and paint throughout the last decade. Yearly attending New Orleans Jazz & Heritage Festival, Magfest, New Year's Eve, NedFest, Telluride Blues and Brews Festival, and the Red Rocks Amphitheatre Easter Sunrise Service.

Living in Colorado afforded him opportunity to performance paint at many Colorado events. Campbell also made numerous journeys to Europe. The Netherlands, Spain, London, Mexico, Thailand, Cambodia and Italy are among the many countries he has visited.

Campbell became a Historian and tour guide for the Red Rocks Amphitheatre in 2009. In 2010 he was proclaimed Mayor for a Day at Red Rocks' Leftover Salmon performance. Campbell has completed over 2000 performance paintings over his career.
In 2009 Campbell's art was included in the book PhanArt, the art of the fans of Phish.
Campbell became involved with the Arvada Center for the Arts and Humanities, becoming their Artist in Residence in 2011. Also in 2011 Campbell was hired by BookCliff Vineyards to make their winebottles his next canvas.
Campbell is also involved with the Colorado Symphony Orchestra, and the Colorado Youth Symphony Orchestra.

In 2013 Campbell collaborated with Wagner Custom Skis to use the skis as his canvas.  The skis were raffled off at the 2013 Blues and Brews Festival in Telluride, Colorado and won by Jim Woolaway.
Campbell was approached by documentary film maker Eric Abramson which resulted in an award-winning documentary called ScrambleVision Released in 2013.

Further reading 
"Scramble Campbell's performance painting highlighted at NedFest", Longmont Times-Call August 23, 2012
"Arvada artist Scramble Campbell is a visual musician", Denver Post November 13, 2014.
"Keith "Scramble" Campbell likes his art the way he likes his music: live and on the road", Westword August 25, 2014

References

External links 
 
 Scramble Campbell on YouTube

1964 births
Living people
American printmakers
Artists from Florida
People from Manchester, New Hampshire
Pseudonymous artists
People from Casselberry, Florida